The Mont Ventoux Dénivelé Challenge is a professional cycle road race first held in 2019, which takes place between Vaison-la-Romaine and Mont Ventoux. The event is classified by the UCI as category 1.1 in the UCI Europe Tour.

Winners – Men

Winners – Women

References

External links
 Official site

 
UCI Europe Tour races
Cycle races in France
2019 establishments in France
Recurring sporting events established in 2019